John Barker is a South African filmmaker in Johannesburg. He gained prominence through his feature directorial debut Bunny Chow (2006), which screened at the Toronto International Film Festival (TIFF). His other films include Spud 3: Learning to Fly (2014), Wonder Boy for President (2015), and The Umbrella Men (2022).

Early life
Barker was born to parents Clive Barker (Bafana Bafana coach) and Yvonne. During the 2010 FIFA World Cup in South Africa, Barker made a documentary Soccer: South of the Umbilo about his childhood growing up in the southern suburbs of Durban, which produced many soccer players and coaches including his father.

Career
Barker wrote, directed and produced South Africa's first music mockumentary Blu Cheez. He next directed the music documentary Kwaito Generals produced by Kutloano Skosana of Black Rage, which focused on the stars who were at the forefront of the Kwaito movement of the late nineties and early 2000s. During this time he joined The Pure Monate Show.  He directed sketches in season one and directed and co-wrote sketches for the second season.

Barker then wrote, produced and directed Bunny Chow, which employed a retro scripting technique with the actors improvising their dialogue to communicate the outlined script written by Barker, David Kibuuka, Kagiso Lediga, Joey Rasdien and editor Saki Bergh. Barker next directed Spud 3: Learning to Fly with Troye Sivan, John Cleese and Caspar Lee. Wonder Boy for President is his second retro scripted film with many of his collaborators from Bunny Chow; the film is a satirical look at South African politics. Barker later completed The Umbrella Men, selected to screen at the 2022 Toronto International Film Festival.

Work
 Blu Cheez (2003)
 Kwaito Generals (2003)
 Bunny Chow (2006)
 Cassette: Who do you Trust (2007) documentary on South African band Cassette.
 Soccer: South of the Umbilo (2010)
 31 Million Reasons (2011)
 Spud 3: Learning to Fly (2014)
 Wonder Boy for President (2015)
 The Umbrella Men (2022)

References

 Jozi Film Fest announces winners, a new partnership with Discovery, Gauteng Film Commission, 19 September 2016
 Bunny Chow, Fandor
 John Barker, African Film Festival New York]
 Anna Marie de la Fuente, ‘King’ anointed at Cape Town fest, Variety, November 21, 2008
 Christelle De Jager, Toronto hops on ‘Bunny Chow’, Variety, August 13, 2006
 https://variety.com/2006/film/news/mtv-films-boarding-bunny-chow-1117949559/
 https://variety.com/2006/film/reviews/bunny-chow-know-thyself-1200511944/
 http://www.news24.com/SouthAfrica/News/Local-film-to-premiere-in-US-20061023
 http://www.screenafrica.com/pls/cms/iac.page?p_t1=2054&p_t2=4714&p_t3=0&p_t4=0&p_dynamic=YP&p_content_id=639550&p_site_id=103
 http://www.hollywoodreporter.com/news/rotterdam-fest-selects-15-tiger-127495
 http://www.raindance.co.uk/site/index.php?id=62,264,0,0,1,0
 http://www.screenafrica.com/pls/cms/iac.page?p_t1=2054&p_t2=4718&p_t3=0&p_t4=0&p_dynamic=YP&p_content_id=662912&p_site_id=103
 http://www.artlink.co.za/news_article.htm?contentID=3053
 http://artmatters.info/2008/09/sithengi-film-and-television-market-faces-uncertain-future/
 http://mg.co.za/article/2006-11-24-quest-for-bums-on-seats
 https://variety.com/2006/film/markets-festivals/king-anointed-at-cape-town-fest-1117954395/
 https://www.imdb.com/title/tt3121562/
 https://tiff.net/events/the-umbrella-men

External links

John Barker at Linkedin

Living people
South African film directors
People from Johannesburg
Year of birth missing (living people)